Sagri may refer to:
 Sagri (Rawalpindi), a town and union council in Punjab, Pakistan
 Sagri (Jhelum), a village in Dina Tehsil, Punjab, Pakistan
 Sagri (Assembly constituency), a constituency of the Azamgarh district of Uttar Pradesh, India

See also
 Saagri (disambiguation)